MV Loch Seaforth may refer to:

 Stornoway mailboat operated by David MacBrayne from 1947 until 1972
, a Calmac ferry built in 2014 for the Stornoway – Ullapool route.

Ship names